Ogden High School is an Art Deco secondary school located in Ogden, Utah, educating students in grades 10–12. Operated by the Ogden City School District, Ogden High enrolls approximately 1,250 students each year. The graduation rate has increased dramatically over the past three years. The school houses an International Baccalaureate Programme, a Project Lead the Way program and a thriving Life Sciences/Pre-Med program. OHS also offers a dozen AP classes and the AVID program. Ogden High has most recently earned state championships in both marching band and girls soccer. Both teams won state championships in 2019 and 2021. The Ogden High mascot is the Tiger.  In 2012, Ogden High School began offering International Baccalaureate courses and in 2014 graduated the first IB Diploma Programme class.

City landmark
Ogden High School is recognized as an architectural landmark in Ogden, and was designed by the architectural firm of Hodgson and McClenahan.  Other buildings of historical interest designed by Hodgson and McClenahan include Peery's Egyptian Theatre, the Regional Forest Service Building, and the City and County Building.  The building was completed in 1937 at a cost over $1 million, reportedly the first high school to exceed that cost.

The building was added to the National Register of Historic Places in 1983. In 2004, the National Trust for Historic Preservation provided a $10,000,000 matching grant to restore Ogden High School. In 2006 a bond was passed by the district for the remodeling of Ogden High School, including a new cafeteria, gym complex, and performing arts center in the first stage, along with other district requirements. The blueprint process began in December 2006.

The renovation project was completed in 2012 at a cost of $64 million, funded by tax revenues, large donations, and community fundraising. In 2013 the school and the project principals won a preservation award from the National Trust for Historic Preservation.

Renovations

The main parking lots and the ceramics building were demolished in the summer of 2007. New parking lots for faculty and visitors were built on the north end facing 28th Street, and the south end in the former 29th Street corridor. A commons area is being constructed on the site of the old parking lot.

The original OHS cafeteria closed in March 2008 for an expansion/remodeling project.

Renovations of the school include removing asbestos, building a gym complex and science labs, and restoring the auditorium and the rotunda areas. Construction of a new state-of-the-art gym/athletic complex has been completed and the pool was refurbished to become an eight-lane competition pool which was slated to reopen in winter 2014.

Further changes are taking place at the high school in order to better accommodate the three smaller learning communities.

Notable alumni
 Joe Aguirre, NFL player 
 John B. Arrington, Utah state legislator
 Clyde Brock, CFL and NFL player
 Val A. Browning, son of John Browning
 Arnie Ferrin, Utah and NBA player* 
 Dave Gray, professional baseball player
 Wataru Misaka, NBA player
 Glen Redd, NFL player
 Sarah Sellers, runner-up at 2018 Boston Marathon
 Bob Sneddon, NFL player

Photo gallery

References

External links

 Ogden High School website
 Ogden City School District website

Public high schools in Utah
School buildings on the National Register of Historic Places in Utah
Buildings and structures in Ogden, Utah
Schools in Weber County, Utah
National Register of Historic Places in Weber County, Utah
International Baccalaureate schools in Utah
Public Works Administration in Utah
Art Deco architecture in Utah
1937 establishments in Utah
Educational institutions established in 1937